Nymphoides geminata, commonly known as entire marshwort, is an aquatic plant of the family Menyanthaceae native to eastern Australia.

It was first described by Robert Brown in 1810 as Villarsia geminata, but was transferred to the genus, Nymphoides by Otto Kuntze in 1891.

References

geminata
Freshwater plants
Flora of New South Wales
Taxa named by Robert Brown (botanist, born 1773)
Plants described in 1810